Platylobium montanum   is a  shrub species that is endemic to Australia. It is a member of the family Fabaceae and of the genus Platylobium. The species was first formally described in 2011.

Two subspecies are currently recognised:
Platylobium montanum I.Thomps. subsp. montanum (Type: Wabonga Plateau)
Platylobium montanum subsp. prostratum I.Thomps. (Type: Kinglake National Park)

References

montanum
Fabales of Australia
Flora of the Australian Capital Territory
Flora of New South Wales
Flora of Victoria (Australia)
Plants described in 2011